Charlotte Vandine Forten (1785–1884) was an American abolitionist and matriarch of the Philadelphia Forten family.

Biography
Forten née Vandine  was born in 1785 in Philadelphia, Pennsylvania. In 1805 she married James Forten (1766–1842). The couple had many children, the most notable were Harriet Forten Purvis, Margaretta Forten, and Sarah Louisa Forten Purvis often referred to as the "Forten Sisters". Her granddaughter Charlotte Forten Grimké (1837–1914) was a prominent abolitionist and educator.

Charlotte and her daughters were founders of the Philadelphia Female Anti-Slavery Society (PFASS) in 1833. According to the "Pennsylvania, Philadelphia City Death Certificates, 1803-1915" she died on December 30, 1884, in Philadelphia.

References

1785 births
1884 deaths
American abolitionists
People from Philadelphia
African-American activists
African-American history in Philadelphia